Beni Schmidt (born 26 April 1974) is a Swiss lightweight rower. He won a gold medal at the 1997 World Rowing Championships in Aiguebelette with the lightweight men's coxless pair.

References

1974 births
Living people
Swiss male rowers
World Rowing Championships medalists for Switzerland